Bang Chang is a tambon (sub-district) of Amphawa District, Samut Songkhram Province, central Thailand.

History
Bang Chang's history dates to the Ayutthaya Kingdom. During that time, Bang Chang was the name of entirety Samut Songkhram Province, its area covered to parts of Bang Khonthi and Mueang Samut Songkhram Districts with Damnoen Saduak District in Ratchaburi Province as well.

Between Ayutthaya to early Rattanakosin periods, Bang Chang was dubbed "Suan Nok" (outer garden), paired with "Suan Nai" (inner garden) or Bangkok. Because they have a very similar terrain, which was filled with orchards and there was many watercourses flowing through both areas.

Bang Chang has long been known for being an area for agriculture, especially mango.

Its name  "Bang Chang" meaning "place of elephants", because it used to be a habitat for many herd of wild elephants and was also a hideout for the white elephants.

Until the establishment of Amphawa District officially, Bang Chang were reduced to sub-district and changed the name to "Pak Ngam" (ปากง่าม), consisting of 12 administrative villages.

In the year 1941, its name therefore changed again to Bang Chang in accordance with the original name. Khun Bang Chang (ขุนบางช้าง) was the first head of the sub-district.

Bang Chang was also the birthplace of Amarindra, the Queen Consort of King Phutthayotfa Chulalok (Rama I), and the mother of King Phutthaloetla Naphalai (Rama II). She also the origin of the royal family surname na Bang Chang (ณ บางช้าง).

Geography
Bang Chang have an area of 2,745 rais (4.39 km2, or 1.69 mi2). The lowland area has a majority of horticulture.

Neighboring sub-districts are (from the north clockwise): Bang Phrom of Bang Khonthi District, Khlong Khoen and Ban Prok of Mueang Samut Songkhram District, Amphawa and Khwae Om in its district.  

Bang Chang is located 8 km (4.97 mi) from the downtown Samut Songkhram.

Economy
Most Bang Chang residents work in agriculture.

Administration
Bang Chang is administered by the Subdistrict Administrative Organization (SAO) Bang Chang (องค์การบริหารส่วนตำบลบางช้าง).

Local products
Traditional Thai sweets
Benjarong (traditional five-coloured Thai ceramics)
Bang Chang bird's eye chilli
Shredded tobacco

References

Tambon of Samut Songkhram Province